Ebbe Roe Smith (born June 25, 1949) is an American actor and screenwriter, who wrote the film Falling Down. As an actor, Smith  has appeared in such films and television series as Outrageous Fortune, The Big Easy, Fatal Beauty and Murphy Brown.

Filmography

References

External links

1949 births
American male screenwriters
American male television actors
American male film actors
20th-century American male actors
Living people
Edgar Award winners